The Palliyagodella massacre was carried out by the Liberation Tigers of Tamil Eelam (LTTE) against the mostly Muslim population of the Palliyagodella village located on border region of the northern part of Sri Lanka that were controlled by the Tigers at the time. This was the largest massacre of Muslim civilians by the LTTE to date. Village eyewitnesses claim that some 285 men, women and children, around a third of the population, were killed by a 1,000 strong force of the Tamil Tigers; however, the Sri Lankan government states that the LTTE massacred 166 to 171. All but 40 of the victims of the Palliyathidal massacre were Muslim; the rest were Sinhalese.

Before the massacre, there were growing tension between the LTTE and the Muslim community. The Palliyagodella villagers had asked the Sri Lankan military for protection from LTTE extortion. The Sri Lankan forces issued shotguns to the Muslim villagers but these were inadequate to beat off LTTE attacks. The LTTE threw grenades into mosques killing around 40 people and slaughtered another more with machetes and guns. Forty-five children were among the victims as were pregnant women and their unborn babies. The LTTE called off the massacre at 8 o'clock when army helicopters arrived. Female LTTE cadres and child soldiers were also involved in this attack.

Pitchathambi Ishabdeen, a local shopkeeper who survived the massacre recounted the massacre as follows:

Notes

Further reading 
 Gunaratna, Rohan. (1998). Sri Lanka's Ethnic Crisis and National Security, Colombo: South Asian Network on Conflict Research. 
 Gunaratna, Rohan. (October 1, 1987). War and Peace in Sri Lanka: With a Post-Accord Report From Jaffna, Sri Lanka: Institute of Fundamental Studies. 
 Gunasekara, S.L. (November 4, 2003). The Wages of Sin, 
 http://www.bbc.co.uk/sinhala/news/story/2006/09/060924_muttur_muslims.shtml
 https://www.rand.org/pubs/monograph_reports/MR1405/MR1405.ch3.pdf

Attacks on civilians attributed to the Liberation Tigers of Tamil Eelam
Massacres in Sri Lanka
Liberation Tigers of Tamil Eelam attacks in Eelam War II
Massacres in 1992
Mass murder of Sri Lankan Muslims
October 1992 events in Asia
Terrorist incidents in Sri Lanka in 1992
Massacres of Muslims